Arena AufSchalke, currently known as Veltins-Arena for sponsorship reasons, is an indoor football stadium in Gelsenkirchen, North Rhine-Westphalia, Germany. It opened on 13 August 2001, as the new home ground for Bundesliga club FC Schalke 04.

It hosted the 2004 UEFA Champions League Final and five matches at the 2006 FIFA World Cup, including a quarter-final. It has a capacity of 62,271 (standing and seated) for league matches and 54,740 (seated only) for international matches. The stadium has a retractable roof and a retractable pitch. The naming rights to the stadium were sold on 1 July 2005 to German brewery Veltins.

History
Plans to construct a new stadium emerged in the late 1990s, as fans and managers sought to move out of the outdated Parkstadion, and create a thoroughly modern multifunctional arena. Following Schalke 04's historic 1997 victory in the UEFA Cup, and the club's upcoming 100th anniversary in 2004, the contract to construct a €186 million stadium was given in 1998 to the German construction firm HBM.

Site and layout
The site chosen for Schalke 04's new stadium is in the direct vicinity of the old Parkstadion, on an extensive piece of club owned property known as the "Berger Feld". Unfortunately, two mine shafts of the "Consolidation" and "Hugo" coal-mines run directly beneath this field at a depth of 800 m. These shafts (in use until 2000) would have caused unwanted shifts and tensions that could have compromised the structural integrity of the stadium. To avoid this, the main axis was rotated from the classic north–south arrangement to a northeast–southwest alignment, making the arena parallel to the mines.

The Veltins-Arena was created as a multi-functional arena of two tiers that completely surround the playing field. These allow for a league capacity of 62,271 spectators (standing and seated) and an international capacity of 54,740. For league matches, the North stand is left as standing rows (capacity: 16,307) to accommodate the Schalke 04 fans, while for international matches, these are converted to seats (capacity: 8,600). The 72 VIP lounges form a ring around the entire stadium, separating the first tier from the second tier. On the main Western grandstand, the VIP capacity is increased by a second level of lounges directly beneath the main belt.

These were packed into mounds to support the four main stands, which were made out of pre-fabricated, reinforced concrete sections. Leading into the four corners of the arena are  tunnels, which serve both as access for construction and assembly, and as ventilation for the interior.

Roof and pitch
The Veltins-Arena features a Teflon-coated fiberglass canvas retractable roof, which spans the entire stadium. The roof is supported by a rectangular truss that is suspended above the field, which is in turn connected to the main building via 24 steel pylons. The center of the roof can be opened into two halves, allowing for an opened or covered stadium, depending on weather and event. To reduce the exterior noise of up to 105 decibels during concerts, a second layer of Teflon-coated fiberglass canvas was added over the first, creating a dampening air cushion. The centrally suspended scoreboard, similar to those found inside indoor sports arenas, was the first of its kind in football stadium, and has since been copied in the Commerzbank-Arena in Frankfurt and the Esprit Arena in Düsseldorf.

Like the Sapporo Dome in Japan, the State Farm Stadium and Allegiant Stadium in the U.S. and the GelreDome in the Netherlands, the Veltins-Arena features a slide-out pitch. Supported by a  substructure, the playing field can be moved in and out of the stadium within four hours. This has several advantages:
The grass playing surface can grow under normal outside conditions without suffering from a lack of circulation and light as in other arenas.
The football pitch is not damaged during indoor events such as concerts.
The floor of the multi-functional hall can be converted and retro-fitted within a short amount of time.
The outside area that is not occupied by the field can be used as parking facilities for buses during football matches.

Catering and venues
To provide for over 60,000 spectators, the Veltins-Arena is equipped with an abundance of catering facilities.

Other events
The Veltins-Arena has hosted an array of important events, including the UEFA Champions League final of 2004. During the renovation of Rheinstadion in Düsseldorf, the Arena served as the temporary home of the Rhein Fire of NFL Europe, an American football league. World Bowl XII was hosted by the stadium. The versatility of the stadium was put to the test in May 2004 when the Veltins-Arena hosted a pop concert, a Bundesliga match and an NFL Europe game all within 96 hours. Other events have included the biathlon World Team Challenge exhibition race, stock car races and operas. In June 2009, it was the scene of a world heavyweight championship boxing match between Wladimir Klitschko and Ruslan Chagaev, which drew an audience of 60,000.

2006 FIFA World Cup
The stadium was one of the venues for the 2006 World Cup. However, because FIFA controls all sponsorship associated with its tournaments (including that of competition venues), the arena was called FIFA World Cup Stadium Gelsenkirchen during the World Cup. Wayne Rooney was sent off for England in the quarterfinal game against Portugal.

The following games were played at the stadium during the 2006 World Cup:

2007 Speedway Grand Prix of Germany

The Veltins-Arena hosted the final Grand Prix of the 2007 motorcycle speedway World Championship season on 13 October 2007, the 2007 Speedway Grand Prix of Germany, the 100th Grand Prix in the history of the competition. It was billed as "The richest minute in motorsport". The winner of the event won US$100,000 by virtue of winning the final heat of the event, with each heat taking about one minute to complete. 25,000 fans saw the Grand Prix won by Swedish rider Andreas Jonsson, who beat American Greg Hancock, and Australians, Jason Crump and Leigh Adams in the final. Nicki Pedersen who went out of the competition at the semi-final stage was crowned World Champion.

Andreas Jonsson and Greg Hancock jointly hold the four-lap record having set a time of 56.9 seconds in heats 21 and 23 respectively.

2008 Speedway Grand Prix of Germany
The Veltins-Arena was supposed to host the 2008 Speedway Grand Prix of Germany. It was scheduled to take place on 11 October 2008. However, the meeting was cancelled because the track (temporary) was deemed unsafe by the Fédération Internationale de Motocyclisme (FIM) jury due to adverse weather conditions (even though the retractable roof was closed for the duration of laying the track). The event was re-staged at the Polonia Stadium, Bydgoszcz, Poland, on 18 October and was renamed the 2008 FIM Final Speedway Grand Prix.

2010 Ice Hockey World Championship
The opening game of the 74th IIHF World Championship took place at Veltins-Arena on 7 May 2010. At this occasion the crowd of 77,803 set a then World Record for ice hockey attendance. The host team Germany beat the United States 2–1 in overtime.

2018 German Darts Masters
The stadium hosted the 2018 German Darts Masters. The event achieved a record-breaking attendance of 20,210, the most ever at a darts event. The event was won by Mensur Suljović.

Concerts
The arena is frequently used as a venue to host concerts. It has hosted three editions of the Rock im Pott festival, in 2012, 2013, and 2017 with artists like Placebo, The BossHoss, Red Hot Chili Peppers, Biffy Clyro, Deftones, Casper, Tenacious D, Volbeat and System of a Down. The arena hosted other concerts besides Rock im Pott by artists like The Rolling Stones, Bruce Springsteen, Bon Jovi, Guns N' Roses, Robbie Williams, Metallica, AC/DC, U2, Coldplay, Depeche Mode, Hardwell, Ed Sheeran, Pur, Herbert Grönemeyer and Pink.

It is one of the stages for an upcoming Rammstein stadium tour.

Inspiration of other stadiums

Highly acclaimed, the Veltins-Arena served as a model for State Farm Stadium. This stadium shares features with its German counterpart such as a retractable roof and a slide-out pitch. Veltins-Arena has also been a source of inspiration for Friends Arena. The arena also has ties to Lucas Oil Stadium. In that stadium, the retractable-roof also opens lengthwise from the center to the touchlines.

See also

Speedway Grand Prix of Germany

References

Further reading
Gernot Stick, Stadien 2006, Basel: Birkhäuser 2005
Stahlbau Spezial: Arenen im 21. Jahrhundert, Berlin: Ernst & Sohn, Ausg. Januar 2005

External links

Official site 

American football venues in Germany
2006 FIFA World Cup stadiums
UEFA Euro 2024 stadiums
Football venues in Germany
Sports venues in North Rhine-Westphalia
Retractable-pitch stadiums
Retractable-roof stadiums in Europe
FC Schalke 04
Sport in Gelsenkirchen
2001 establishments in Germany
Sports venues completed in 2001